The  was a battle that took place along the banks of the Nagara River in Mino Province in April 1556. The site of the battle is in present-day Gifu city, Gifu Prefecture, Japan. It was a battle between Saitō Dōsan and his son, Saitō Yoshitatsu, who had instigated a coup d'etat.

Background
In 1542, Dōsan became the representative of the Toki clan and ruled over Mino Province as such. He had originally planned on passing his power onto his son Yoshitatsu but, in 1555, he started thinking of passing it on to one of his other sons, Kiheiji (喜平次) or maybe to his son-in-law Nobunaga, who he thought was much more gifted than his biological sons.

Battle
Yoshitatsu, who was living in Sagiyama Castle at the time, heard of his father's plans and, in 1556, killed his two brothers in the family residence on Mount Inaba, starting the intra-family skirmish. Yoshitatsu was able to gain the support of a large portion of the family's soldiers, gathering approximately 17,500 men. Dōsan, on the other hand, was only able to amass around 2,700 soldiers.

Yoshitatsu handily won the battle, which ended in Dōsan's death. Dōsan's son-in-law, Oda Nobunaga, sent troops to support him, but they did not reach the battle in time to offer any help. It is believed that Akechi Mitsuhide participated in this battle, he sided with Dōsan.

See also
 List of Japanese battles
 Takenaka Shigeharu

References

Nagaragawa 1556
Gifu
1556 in Japan
Nagara-gawa